Kjeld Thorst (born 13 May 1940) is a Danish former association football player and manager. During his club career he played as a striker for Aalborg Boldspilklub (AaB), scoring 88 goals in 265 games, and winning the 1966 Danish Cup with the club. He scored six goals in 26 games for the Denmark national football team from 1963 to 1969, and represented Denmark at the 1964 European Nations' Cup tournament. In 1966 he became the first ever AaB player to captain the Danish national team. After ending his career, he was manager of AaB from 1976 to 1977.

His son Søren Thorst also became a noted player for AaB, albeit as a defender.

Honours
1966 Danish Cup

External links
Profile at DBU
AaB profile
Haslund profile

1940 births
Danish men's footballers
Denmark international footballers
1964 European Nations' Cup players
AaB Fodbold players
Living people
AaB Fodbold managers
Association football forwards
Danish football managers